Braystones is a village in Cumbria, England, historically within Cumberland.

Traditionally a scattered community based on agriculture, it has grown considerably during the 20th century by firstly, the construction of holiday cabins on the beach, and latterly by the creation of large caravan parks. It has long been a popular holiday area.

Governance
Braystones is in the parliamentary constituency of Copeland, Trudy Harrison is the Member of parliament.

For Local Government purposes it is in the Beckermet Ward of Borough of Copeland and the Gosforth Ward of Cumbria County Council.

The village has its own Parish Council; Lowside Quarter Parish Council.

Nuclear

In 2009, Braystones was approved by the British government as a site for a new nuclear power station. However, the site was ruled out by Secretary of State for Energy and Climate Change Chris Huhne in October 2010 for environmental reasons with the former government's list of eleven potential sites reduced to eight.

Transport

Braystones railway station is on the Cumbrian Coast Line and has been served by the railway since 1850.

Gallery

References

External links
 Cumbria County History Trust: Lowside Quarter (nb: provisional research only – see Talk page)

Villages in Cumbria
Populated coastal places in Cumbria
Borough of Copeland